The Tönsberg is a hill ridge in the Teutoburg Forest that reaches a height of  and lies in the district of Lippe near Oerlinghausen. Hermann's Way runs over the Tönsberg for about 3.5 km.

Points of interest 
Along Hermann's Way on the crest of the Tönsberg are several points of interest:

Hünenkapelle 
To the east of the long ridge of the Tönsberg are the ruins of a pre-historic hillfort (Sachsenlager) and a chapel known as the Hünenkapelle. The fortification was probably used until the 9th century as a defensive site and refuge. The chapel would have been built in the time when Christianity reached the Saxons under Frankish rule. The name "Tönsberg" could go back to Holy Anthony, in whose honour the first Christian chapel could have been dedicated.

Löns Monument 
In 1898 the writer, Hermann Löns, walked over Tönsberg; his impressions are recorded in his narrative, Frau Einsamkeit ("Lady Loneliness"), which appeared in 1911 in the volume Da draußen vor dem Tore. Heimatliche Naturbilder.. Dort  Thirty years later a monument to him was erected on the Tönsberg and unveiled on 9 September 1928.

War memorial 

In 1930 a war memorial was unveiled to remember the fallen from the First World War; over 5,000 people climbed the Tönsberg for the opening ceremony. It was created by the sculptor, Berthold Müller-Oerlinghausen; a soldier lies on a sarcophagus framed by columns.

In the Second World War, a British aeroplane crashed in the vicinity of the memorial in February 1945 killing two airmen. The memorial was lightly damaged.

Kumsttonne 
On the Tönsberg is the ruin of an old windmill dating to 1753. The cylindrical base of the windmill is known as the Kumsttonne ("Sauerkraut barrel") and is an emblem of the town of Oerlinghausen on the north slopes of the Tönsberg.

Coat of arms 

The Tönsberg appears, in stylised form on the coat of arms for the town of Oerlinghausen; it is the middle one of three hills depicted.

Sources 
Andreas Rahns: Der Tönsberg bei Oerlinghausen. Lippische Kulturlandschaften, Heft 7. 2007.

References 

Lippe
Mountains and hills of North Rhine-Westphalia
Teutoburg Forest